Triplophysa xiangshuingensis is a species of ray-finned fish in the genus Triplophysa endemic to Yunnan, China.

Footnotes 

X
Freshwater fish of China
Endemic fauna of Yunnan
Fish described in 2004